Warren Villas was a nature reserve managed by the Wildlife Trust for Bedfordshire, Cambridgeshire and Northamptonshire. The former site is situated by the River Ivel to the south of the town of Sandy in the county of Bedfordshire.

References

External links 
 Wildlife Trust of Bedfordshire, Cambridgeshire and Northamptonshire website

Nature reserves in Bedfordshire
Wildlife Trust for Bedfordshire, Cambridgeshire and Northamptonshire reserves